Physalozercon raffray is a species of mite, placed in its own family, Physalozerconidae, in the order Mesostigmata.

References

Mesostigmata